Allophrys is a genus of the parasitic wasp family Ichneumonidae.

Species
 Allophrys astafurovae Khalaim, 2013
 Allophrys barycnemica Khalaim & Broad, 2012
 Allophrys bribria Khalaim & Broad, 2012
 Allophrys broadi Khalaim, 2013
 Allophrys bruneiensis Khalaim, 2011
 Allophrys budongoana Khalaim, 2013
 Allophrys calculator Khalaim, 2013
 Allophrys cantonensis Reshchikov & Yue, 2017
 Allophrys compressor Khalaim & Broad, 2012
 Allophrys dictator Khalaim, 2013
 Allophrys divaricata Horstmann, 2010
 Allophrys excavator Khalaim, 2013
 Allophrys granulata Khalaim, 2013
 Allophrys hansoni Khalaim & Broad, 2012
 Allophrys matsumurai Khalaim, 2017
 Allophrys megafrons Khalaim & Broad, 2012
 Allophrys meggoleuca Khalaim, 2017
 Allophrys noyesi Khalaim & Broad, 2012
 Allophrys occipitata Khalaim, 2011
 Allophrys oculata (Ashmead, 1895)
 Allophrys scitula Khalaim, 2013
 Allophrys takemotoi Khalaim, 2017
 Allophrys tractor Khalaim, 2013
 Allophrys townesi (Khalaim, 2007)

Allophrys falcatus Reshchikov, 2017 was transferred to the genus Microctonus.

References

External links
Species List

Ichneumonidae genera